Amblyeleotris harrisorum is a species of goby currently only recorded from reefs around the island of Kiritimati in the Line Islands, Republic of Kiribati, in the central Pacific at a depth of around . As with other Amblyeleotris species, it has a symbiotic relationship with alpheid shrimps.

This is an elongated goby up to  standard length. The background colour is white marked with five vertical pale orange bars. It is most readily distinguished from its congeners by its very colourful caudal fin, bright yellow with orange and blue margin and also by an oblique yellow stripe behind the eye.

References

External links
 Photograph

harrisorum
Fish described in 2002